Haworth railway station serves the village of Haworth in West Yorkshire, England.

History
It was opened in 1867 along with the rest of the Keighley and Worth Valley Railway, and closed in 1962. Preservation led to the line being reopened in June 1968 and now serves as the headquarters of the railway.  The former goods shed in the railway yard has been expanded into the locomotive shed for the railway providing facilities for the storage, maintenance and overhaul of the locomotives on the line.

In 1967, Look at Life featured the station and its volunteers in the 'Playing Trains' episode.

The station, its immediate environs and the railway workshops are all designated as part of the Haworth Conservation Area by Bradford Council.

Stationmasters

Edward Coates 1867 – 1869
William Posnett ca. 1871 – 1878
D. Daw 1878 – 1880 (formerly station master at Oakworth, afterwards station master at Chapel en le Frith)
Frederick Hayward 1880 – 1914
Walter Beswick 1914 – 1925
E. Crossley 1938 – 1947 (also station master at Oxenhope)

See also
Listed buildings in Haworth, Cross Roads and Stanbury

References

Heritage railway stations in Bradford
Former Midland Railway stations
Railway stations in Great Britain opened in 1867
Railway stations in Great Britain closed in 1962
Railway stations in Great Britain opened in 1968
Keighley and Worth Valley Railway
1962 disestablishments in England
Haworth